Pinyon Pines is an unincorporated community in Riverside County, California.

Geography
It is located in a small valley between the San Jacinto Mountains and Santa Rosa Mountains, north of State Route 74. It takes its name from the Pinyon pine (Pinus monophylla) trees native to the area. Pinyon Pines sits at an elevation of approximately 4000 feet.

Government
Pinyon Pines is in:
 California's 25th congressional district, currently represented by House Representative Raul Ruiz.
 California's 28th State Senate district, currently represented by State Senator Jeff Stone.
 California's 71st State Assembly district, currently represented by Assemblymember Randy Voepel.

History
Pinyon Pines is notable for a 2006 triple homicide that made national attention. Residents 53-year-old Vicki Friedli and her 55-year-old boyfriend, Jon Hayward, were found shot, and Friedl's 18-year-old daughter, Becky, was found outside in a wheelbarrow, burned so badly investigators were unable to determine cause of death. Two men were indicted in March 2014, but the charges were later dismissed. The crime is among the most notorious murders in the Coachella Valley. The two men have since been arrested again.
On August 10, 2018, a jury found Robert Pape, 30, and Cristin Smith, 29, guilty and sentenced both to life in prison without the possibility of parole.

References

External links
 

Unincorporated communities in Riverside County, California
San Jacinto Mountains
Santa Rosa Mountains (California)
Unincorporated communities in California